This list is of the Cultural Properties of Japan designated in the category of  for the Prefecture of Fukuoka.

National Cultural Properties
As of 1 July 2019, twenty-two Important Cultural Properties have been designated (including one *National Treasure), being of national significance.

Prefectural Cultural Properties
As of 1 May 2019, twenty-two properties have been designated at a prefectural level.

Municipal Cultural Properties
As of 1 May 2015, fifty-one properties have been designated at a municipal level.

See also
 Cultural Properties of Japan
 List of National Treasures of Japan (paintings)
 Japanese painting
 List of Historic Sites of Japan (Fukuoka)

References

External links
  Cultural Properties in Fukuoka Prefecture
  Cultural Properties in Fukuoka Prefecture

Cultural Properties,Fukuoka
Cultural Properties,Paintings
Paintings,Fukuoka
Lists of paintings